Amarna letter EA 153, titled Ships on Hold, is a short-length clay tablet letter from Abimilku of the island (at Amarna letters time) of city-state Tyre.

One line repeats "...King, Lord-mine...," allowing for only one line of more difficult restoration.

The letter shows a high-gloss surface on the clay tablet, and being a short letter, has only 5 to 8/9 cuneiform characters per line. It contains one special cuneiform sign for ship, MÁ, MÁ (ship Sumerogram), a sign used in both the Amarna letters, and the Epic of Gilgamesh. Also, the letter's scribe used mostly 'very-short' stroked, and 'fat-and-rounded' cuneiform strokes, instead of the more arrow-shaped, sharp, and linear strokes, . Since on EA 153, there are also distinct, medium-sized wedge strokes, (example "be" ) as well as L-shaped strokes (angled stylus), the scribe may have used 2 or more styluses.

The clay tablet letter is located in the Metropolitan Museum of Art, no. 24.2.12.

The Amarna letters, about 300, numbered up to EA 382, are mid 14th century BC, about 1350 BC and 25? years later, correspondence. The initial corpus of letters were found at Akhenaten's city Akhetaten, in the floor of the Bureau of Correspondence of Pharaoh; others were later found, adding to the body of letters.

EA 153, obverse, bottom, and last lines 

Moran's non-linear letter English language translation (translated from the French language):

(Lines 1-3)--[To] the king, my lord: [Mes]sage of Abimilku,1 your servant. I fall at your feet 7 times and 7 times. ( "7 and 7 times" )
(4-5)--I have carried out what the king, my lord, ordered.
(2 repeat sections, 3 lines each)
(6-8)--The entire land-("country-side") is afraid of the troops of the king, my lord.
(9-11)--I have had my men hold ships at the disposition of the troops of the king, my lord.
(12-16)--Whoever has disobeyed has no family, has nothing alive. Since I gua[rd the ci]ty of the king, [my] lo[rd],
(obverse-bottom & reverse)
(17-20)--m[y] s[afety] is the king's responsibility. [May he take cognizance] of his servant who is on his side.2--(obverse, bottom edge, and top of reverse, with lacunae restored, lines 1-20 complete)

EA 153, Akkadian text 
The Akkadian language text, Metropolitan Museum of Art (Spar 1988).

Obverse
-(Line 1)--[ ana ] LUGAL EN-lí-ia
-(2)--[u]m-ma IIa-Bi-LUGAL [ ÌR ]-ka
-(3)--7 u 7 ana GÌR.MEŠ-ka am-qut
-(4)--ša i[q-b ]i LUGAL be-li-ia
-(5)--šu-[ ut ] e-te-pu-uš
-(6)--pal-ha-at gabbu
-(7)--KUR-ti ištu pānu
-(8)--(ÉRIN)ERIM.MEŠ LUGAL EN-lí-ia
-(9)--su-hi-iz-ti LÚ.MEŠ-ia
-(10)--GIŠMÁ.MEŠ ana pānu
-(11)--(ÉRIN)ERIM.MEŠ LUGAL be-li-ia
-(12)--ù ša la iš-te-mi
-(13)--iānu É-šu iānu
-(14)--bal-tá-šu an-nu-ú
-(15)--ana-an-ṣ[ár UR ] U(?)
-(16)--LUGAL be-[ li-ia
Lower Edge
-(17)--[ šu-ul ]-m[i]
-(18)--mu-hi LUGAL li-[[-[de]
Reverse
-(19)--ana ÌR-šu ša
-(20--itti-šu

See also 
Tyre
Amarna letters–phrases and quotations
List of Amarna letters by size
Amarna letter EA 5, EA 9, EA 15, EA 19, EA 26, EA 27, EA 35, EA 38 
EA 153, EA 161, EA 288, EA 364, EA 365, EA 367

References 

Moran, William L. The Amarna Letters. Johns Hopkins University Press, 1987, 1992. (softcover)
Spar, Ira. (1988) Cuneiform Texts in the Metropolitan Museum of Art: Tablets, Cones, and Bricks of the Third and Second Millennia B.C., Vol. 1., EA 153, pp. 150–151. (New York, 1988)

EA 153 photo gallery

External links 
EA 153, obverse, showing high-gloss surface of clay tablet (Metropolitan Museum)
EA 153 description, characteristics at clay tablet letter location, Metropolitan Museum of Art (Clay tablet letter size: 3 1/16 X 2 1/16 in.)

Amarna letters
Ancient Lebanon
History of Tyre, Lebanon
Manuscripts of the Metropolitan Museum of Art